The 2005 Shakey's V-League (SVL) season was the 2nd season of the Shakey's V-League.

1st conference 

The Shakey's V-League 2nd Season 1st Conference was the 3rd conference of the Shakey's V-League. The tournament was held from May 2005 until July 2005.

Participating teams

Final standings

Individual awards

Venues 
 Lyceum Gym, Intramuros, Manila
 PhilSports Arena, Pasig
 Rizal Memorial Coliseum, Manila

References 

2005 in Philippine sport